Adalberto Méndez (born February 22, 1982) is a former professional baseball pitcher. He made his Major League Baseball debut for the Florida Marlins in 2010.

Career

Florida Marlins
Mendez was chosen by the Marlins from the Chicago Cubs in the Double-A phase of the 2007 Rule 5 draft. He was called up to the major leagues for the first time on September 4, 2010. Mendez became a free agent after the 2011 season.

Guerreros de Oaxaca
On June 9, 2012, Mendez signed with the Guerreros de Oaxaca of the Mexican Baseball League. He was released on July 26, 2012.

Piratas de Campeche
On May 18, 2013, Mendez signed with the Piratas de Campeche of the Mexican Baseball League. He was released on May 23, 2013.

Vaqueros Laguna
On May 31, 2013, Mendez signed with the Vaqueros Laguna of the Mexican Baseball League. He became a free agent after the 2013 season.

External links
, or Retrosheet

1982 births
Living people
Baseball players at the 2015 Pan American Games
Boise Hawks players
Cardenales de Lara players
Daytona Cubs players
Dominican Republic expatriate baseball players in Mexico
Dominican Republic expatriate baseball players in the United States
Florida Marlins players
Guerreros de Oaxaca players
Iowa Cubs players
Jacksonville Suns players
Jupiter Hammerheads players
Lansing Lugnuts players
Major League Baseball pitchers
Major League Baseball players from the Dominican Republic
Mexican League baseball pitchers
New Orleans Zephyrs players
People from Santo Domingo
Peoria Chiefs players
Piratas de Campeche players
Tennessee Smokies players
Tigres del Licey players
Toros del Este players
Vaqueros Laguna players
West Tennessee Diamond Jaxx players
Pan American Games competitors for the Dominican Republic
Dominican Republic expatriate baseball players in Venezuela